Jennifer A. Selby is a Canadian scholar and Associate Professor of Religious Studies at Memorial University of Newfoundland. She is known for her research on secularism, women in Islam, gender studies and religious law.
Selby won a Fulbright Fellowship in 2007 and 2016.

Books
 Questioning French Secularism: Gender Politics and Islam in a Parisian Suburb, Palgrave Macmillan Press, 2012
 Debating Sharia: Islam, Gender Politics and Family Law Arbitration, co-edited with Anna C. Korteweg, University of Toronto Press, 2012
 Beyond Accommodation: Everyday Narratives of Muslim Canadians, with  Amelie Barras and Lori G. Beaman, UBC Press, 2019

References

External links
Jennifer Selby at Memorial University of Newfoundland

Living people
Academic staff of the Memorial University of Newfoundland
Political philosophers
Religious studies scholars
McMaster University alumni
Queen's University at Kingston alumni
University of Winnipeg alumni
Year of birth missing (living people)